The Islamic Azad University, Birjand Branch is a university in Birjand, Iran. It was established in 1985.

It has 8500 students in 5 faculties and 90 fields.

Birjand
Educational institutions established in 1985
Birjand
Buildings and structures in South Khorasan Province
Education in South Khorasan Province
1985 establishments in Iran